NDS may stand for:
 Low German (ISO 639-2 language code: nds), a West Germanic language native to Northern Germany, Denmark and the Netherlands
 Lower Saxony, a federal state of Germany
 NDS Group, a company specializing in television technology, including digital rights management, renamed Cisco Videoscape after its acquisition
 NDS is also used as shorthand for VideoGuard, the encryption system created by NDS Group
 National Directorate of Security, the primary foreign and domestic intelligence agency of Afghanistan
 Nintendo DS, a 2004 portable game system
 Novell Directory Services, former name for NetIQ eDirectory, directory service software for a network
 New Data Seal, a block cipher encryption algorithm that was designed at IBM in 1975
 News Distribution Service, operated by the UK government's Central Office of Information
 , a political party in Burkina Faso known in English as New Social Democracy
 Navigation Data Standard, a format for automotive-grade navigation databases
 New Democratic Party, temporarily in 2014 the name for the Serbian political party Social Democratic Party (Serbia) (SDS)
 Nick Dal Santo (born 1984), Australian Rules footballer
 NASA Docking System, a spacecraft docking and berthing mechanism being developed for future US human spaceflight vehicles
 National Defense Strategy of the United States Secretary of Defense
 Norra Djurgårdsstaden, a neighborhood in Stockholm

See also
 NDSH
 NDSI (disambiguation)
 NDSL (disambiguation)
 NDSM
 NDSS (disambiguation)
 NDSU
 NDSV
 NDSW